Ell Pond is a kettle hole in Hopkinton, Washington County, Rhode Island. It is surrounded by a swamp of red maple  and Atlantic white cypress, and by steep granitic monadnocks. The small area contains communities of both hydrophytic and xeric plants, which makes it ideal for ecological research and education. It was designated a National Natural Landmark in May 1974. The preserve is jointly managed by all three entities. There are hiking trails in the preserve, but Ell pond is specifically not reachable due to its fragile environment.

References

External links 
Ell Pond The Nature Conservancy
Audubon Society of Rhode Island Long Pond preserve

National Natural Landmarks in Rhode Island
Nature Conservancy preserves
Protected areas of Washington County, Rhode Island
Nature reserves in Rhode Island
Bodies of water of Washington County, Rhode Island
Lakes of Rhode Island
Ponds of the United States
Protected areas established in 1972
1972 establishments in Rhode Island